Danny Grimshaw (born ) is an English professional rugby league footballer who plays in Betfred League 1 for Hunslet.

Background
Danny Grimshaw was born in Sharlston, Wakefield, West Yorkshire, England.

References

External links
Profile at hunsletrlfc.com
Profile at roughyeds.co.uk
 ĎŔƑ Profile at hunsletrlfc.com
Stanley Rangers ARLFC - Roll of Honour

1986 births
Living people
English rugby league players
Featherstone Rovers players
Hunslet R.L.F.C. players
Oldham R.L.F.C. players
Rugby league centres
Rugby league five-eighths
Rugby league halfbacks
Rugby league locks
Rugby league players from Wakefield
York City Knights players